(January 15, 1737 – August 29, 1754) was a Japanese daimyō of the Edo period, who ruled the Tokushima Domain.

Family
 Father: Matsudaira Yorihiro (1700-1737)
 Mother: Watabe-dono

Reference

1737 births
1754 deaths
Daimyo
Hachisuka clan